Kyi Kyi Htay (19 March 1924 – 4 March 2000) was the first winning actress of the Myanmar Academy Award for the Best Female Artiste Award (now Best Actress Award) in 1952. Being a versatile actress in the golden Burmese film world, she was awarded the title Wunna Kyawhtin by the government.

Early life 

Kyi Kyi Htay was born in a small town of Letbadan in Bago Division in Lower Burma to U Po Yin and Daw Ohn Kywe. She was the youngest among five siblings. Her original name was Ma Thein Kyin.

Career 

Kyi Kyi Htay took part in Burmese traditional opera, Zat Thabin, since her childhood and became famous under the name Aung Mya Kyin, Auk Chin Ma and Marla Yi. She crossed over to films in 1952, and won her first Burmese Academy Award with her debut film Chit Thet-Wai. She won three more Academy Awards in 1956, 1970 and 1978.

She was married to U Aung Thein, and had two children. She died on 4 March 2000 in Yangon.

Awards and nominations

Filmography 

It is said that Kyi Kyi Htay took part as an actress in more than 300 films.

The famous ones are:
 Chit Thet Wai (Dear Thet Wai)
 Yadanabon
 AkyawAmaw (The Renowned One)
 Sakawma (Cakkoma)
 Main Ma Bawa (Female Life)
 Zagar Pyaw Thaw Athe Hnalone (The Speaking Heart)
 Pann Pan Lyet Par (Still Wearing the Flower) 
 Chit Khwint Ma Paing (Not Able to Love)
 Nu Nu Nge Nge (Delicate and Youthful)
 Lu Zaw (The Eminent One)

References 

1924 births
2000 deaths
Burmese film actresses
Burmese stage actresses
Burmese dancers
20th-century Burmese women singers
20th-century Burmese actresses
Recipients of the Wunna Kyawhtin